Cognitive Retention Therapy (CRT)  also known as the Ashby Memory Method is a Cognitive therapy for dementia, based on the research of Dr. Mira Ashby. It is adapted from her programs for brain injury rehabilitation, for which she won the Order of Canada in 1984. CRT is a specifically tailored program to work for the damage done by Alzheimer's disease and other dementia. Combining word exercises, visual stimulation, a process called errorless learning, Stroop exercises and many other techniques from Dr. Ashby's research, CRT creates personalized activities based on participant’s interests to stimulate all 5 senses. CRT is currently undergoing formal clinical studies, but has been presented at different seminars and conventions including the 28th National Conference of the Alzheimer Society of Canada in Toronto, Ontario; and has received positive feedback as a plausible treatment option.

References

Cognitive therapy